Beetham Tower, Liverpool, is a residential apartment building in the British city of Liverpool. Its close neighbour and the tallest building in Liverpool, the West Tower, was also developed by the Beetham Organization.

It is named after the developers, Beetham Organization, was built by Carillion and was completed in early 2004. It is 90 metres (295 ft) tall and has 29 floors. The tower abuts the Radisson Blu Hotel, Liverpool. It lies alongside the River Mersey and the upper floors offer views of the Welsh mountains.

See also
Three other UK towers share the same name:
 Beetham Tower, Birmingham
 Beetham Tower, Manchester
 Beetham Tower, London

References

External links
 
 Beetham Organization homepage (requires flash-player)

Skyscrapers in Liverpool
Residential skyscrapers in England
Buildings and structures in Liverpool
Beetham Tower
Residential buildings in Liverpool